Lawrence Thomas, DD (19 August 1889 - 19 October 1960) was a Welsh Anglican priest and the inaugural Archdeacon of Margam.

He was educated at Lewis School, Pengam; St David's College, Lampeter; St John's College, Oxford; Trinity College, Dublin (studies in Hebrew); and St. Michael's College, Llandaff. He was ordained in 1912. After curacies in Cardiff and Oxford he was the Vicar of Briton Ferry from 1924 to 1942; Vicar of Bargoed from 1942 to 1946; and Vicar of Aberavon from  1946 to 1958. He was Treasurer of Llandaff Cathedral from 1948 until his death.

References

1889 births
1960 deaths
People educated at Lewis School, Pengam
Academics of the University of Wales, Lampeter
Alumni of St John's College, Oxford
Alumni of Trinity College Dublin
Alumni of St Michael's College, Llandaff
Archdeacons of Margam